Actinopyga caerulea, the blue sea cucumber, is a species of sea cucumber in the family Holothuriidae. It is native to the tropical Western Indo-Pacific region and is harvested for food.

Description
The body of this sea cucumber is white, with numerous dark blue tube feet and papillae covering it. The density of these tube feet and papillae, and therefore coloration, can vary from sea cucumber to sea cucumber, but density typically increases on the dorsal area. The body itself is stout, with a thick and firm body wall. The mouth is usually surrounded by 15-30 large shield-shaped feeding tentacles, while the anus is surrounded by five prominent anal teeth, which are white in coloration. The pinkish Cuvierian tubules can be present or absent depending on the specimen, but when present are non-sticky, never expelled, and composed of three distinct parts: the proximal (first) half of the trunk is smooth, the distal (second) half of the trunk is slightly rugged, and highly ragged primary and secondary branches extend beyond that.

Reproduction
Like many other members of the class Holothuroidea, blue sea cucumbers are gonochoric, and only have a single gonad. During spawning season, eggs and sperm are externally released into the surrounding water by female and male individuals, respectively, and are fertilized when they meet.

Distribution and habitat
Actinopyga caerulea is found off the coasts of Asia and Africa, in the tropical Indian Ocean and the western Pacific Ocean. Its range extends from Comoros, to Indonesia, Papua New Guinea, the Philippines, Taiwan, and other island groups in the western Pacific.

Ecology
The emperor shrimp (Periclimenes imperator) is known to inhabit the surface of Actinopyga caerulea in a commensal relationship, possibly feeding on ectoparasites or organic detritus on the surface of its skin. There has also been at least one recorded instance of Pleurosicya mossambica living on it off the coast of Bitung as well.

Conservation status
This species is harvested commercially for food in some parts of its range. It is used in the production of bêche-de-mer in Papua New Guinea, and has also been found in a retail market in Guangzhou, China in 2010. The IUCN lists its conservation status as "data deficient".

References

Holothuriidae
Animals described in 2006
Echinoderms of Oceania
Fauna of Indonesia
Fauna of Papua New Guinea
Fauna of the Comoros
Fauna of the Maldives
Fauna of the Pacific Ocean
Fauna of the Philippines
Invertebrates of Taiwan
Invertebrates of the Indian Ocean
Western Indo-Pacific fauna